This is a list of Cypriot football transfers for the 2011–12 summer transfer window by club. Only transfers of clubs in the Cypriot First Division and Cypriot Second Division are included.

The summer transfer window opened on 9 June 2011, although a few transfers took place prior to that date. The window closed at midnight on 31 August 2011. Players without a club may join one at any time, either during or in between transfer windows.

Marfin Laiki League

AEK Larnaca

In:

Out:

AEL Limassol

In:

Out:

Alki Larnaca

In:

Out:

Anagennisi Dherynia

In:

Out:

Anorthosis

In:

Out:

APOEL

In:

Out:

Apollon Limassol

In:

Out:

Aris Limassol

In:

Out:

Enosis Neon Paralimni

In:

Out:

Ermis Aradippou

In:

Out:

Ethnikos Achna

In:

Out:

Nea Salamina

In:

 

Out:

Olympiakos Nicosia

In:

Out:

Omonia

In:

Out:

Cypriot Second Division

AEP Paphos

In:

Out:

Akritas Chlorakas

In:

Out:

APEP Pitsilia

In:

Out:

APOP Kinyras Peyias

In:

Out:

Atromitos Yeroskipou

In:

Out:

Ayia Napa

In:

Out:

Chalkanoras Idaliou

In:

Out:

Doxa Katokopia

In:

Out:

Enosis Neon Parekklisia

In:

Out:

Ethnikos Assia

In:

Out:

Omonia Aradippou

In:

Out:

Onisilos Sotira

In:

Out:

Othellos Athienou

In:

Out:

PAEEK

In:

Out:

References

See also
 List of Bulgarian football transfers summer 2011
 List of Dutch football transfers summer 2011
 List of English football transfers summer 2011
 List of Maltese football transfers summer 2011
 List of German football transfers summer 2011
 List of Greek football transfers summer 2011
 List of Portuguese football transfers summer 2011
 List of Spanish football transfers summer 2011
 List of Latvian football transfers summer 2011
 List of Serbian football transfers summer 2011

Cypriot
Transfers
2011-12